West Point most commonly refers to the United States Military Academy, at West Point, New York.

West Point may also refer to:

Places

United Kingdom
 West Point (building), a tower block in Leeds, West Yorkshire, England
 Westpoint Arena, a multi-purpose arena near Exeter, UK

United States 
 West Point, Alabama
 West Point, Arkansas
 West Point, California
 West Point, Georgia
 West Point, Illinois
 West Point, Indiana
 West Point, Iowa
 West Point, Kentucky
 West Point, Minnesota
 West Point, Mississippi
 West Point, Nebraska
 West Point, New York
 West Point Cemetery on the United States Military Academy grounds, West Point, New York
 West Point Mint, in New York
 West Point, Columbiana County, Ohio
 West Point, Morrow County, Ohio
 West Point, Pennsylvania
 Westpoint, Tennessee
 West Point, Texas (disambiguation)
 West Point, Utah
 West Point, Virginia
 West Point (Seattle), Washington
 West Point Light, Seattle
 West Point, Wisconsin, a town

Elsewhere
 West Point, Hong Kong
 West Point, Monrovia, Liberia
 West Point, Prince Edward Island, Canada
 West Point Island, Falkland Islands
 Westpoint Performing Arts Centre, a performance venue in Auckland

Arts, entertainment, and media
 West Point (film), a 1928 silent film starring Joan Crawford and William Haines
 The West Point Story (film), a 1950 musical comedy film 
 The West Point Story (TV series), also known as simply West Point, a dramatic anthology television series

Ships
 West Point (1847), a full-rigged sailing vessel built by Jacob Aaron Westervelt
 , a cargo ship built in 1918
 USS West Point (AP-23), an ocean liner built in 1940

Organisations
 Westpoint Corporation
 WestPoint Home, Inc.

Other uses
 West Point (air conditioners), brand of air conditioners
 West Point (locomotive), the second steam locomotive built in the United States